The , often referred to as the , is a group of dialects or dialect continuum of the Japanese language spoken mainly within the area of the former Ōsumi and Satsuma provinces now incorporated into the southwestern prefecture of Kagoshima. It may also be collectively referred to as the Satsuma dialect (  or  ), owing to both the prominence of the Satsuma Province and the region of the Satsuma Domain which spanned the former Japanese provinces of Satsuma, Ōsumi and the southwestern part of Hyūga. The Satsugū dialect is commonly cited for its mutual unintelligibility to even its neighboring Kyūshū variants, prompting the Max Planck Institute for Evolutionary Anthropology to classify it as a distinct language in the Japanesic branch in its Glottolog database. It shares over three-quarters of the Standard Japanese vocabulary corpus and some areal features of Kyūshū.

Distribution and subdialects 

The boundaries of the Satsugū dialect are traditionally defined as the former region controlled by the Satsuma Domain, which primarily encompassed the main portion of the Kagoshima Prefecture, located in the southern part of Japan's Kyushu Island, and a small part of the Miyazaki Prefecture to the East. For precision, this area could be further separated into three distinct branches of the Satsugū dialect: the Satsuma dialect spoken in western Kagoshima, the Ōsumi dialect spoken in eastern Kagoshima, and the Morokata dialect spoken in the southwesternmost part of the Miyazaki Prefecture.

However, the dialectal differences are much more localized making this three-way distinction superficial. Variations in pronunciation, words, expressions and grammatical constructions may occur between neighboring cities, towns and villages, with peripheral islands exhibiting greater divergence due to isolation. As such, Satsugū may be considered a dialect continuum, differing only slightly between areas that are geographically close, and gradually decreasing in mutual intelligibility as the distances become greater. By this token, all major areas of the mainland—including Satsuma, Ōsumi, Morokata, and possibly also a small fraction of southern Kumamoto—may form a single, closely related dialect branch with no precise boundaries due to continuous contact between the regions. Conversely, the peripheral islands are easier to distinguish and seemingly form three distinct, but related clades associated with the proximity of the islands. These would be: the Koshikijima Islands to the West, the Ōsumi Islands directly to the South (such as Tanegashima, Yakushima, and Kuchinoerabu), and the Tokara Islands in the very far South. The variants spoken on the Amami Islands are not considered part of the Satsugū dialect, but are rather part of the Northern Ryukyuan language branch.

Further subdivisions are possible for all areas, and a classification tree of the general Satsugū sub-dialects might look something like the following (areas in parentheses indicate approximate regions):

History 
Historically, Satsuma had maintained an influential control over the trading routes that bounded the Kyūshū island to the Ryukyu Islands, Mainland Japan and by extension, the rest of the world. Its commercial importance to the rest of Japan was reflected in the adoption of such terms as Satsuma imo (sweet potato), Satsuma yaki (Satsuma styled pottery), and Satsuma jisho (Japanese-English dictionary). Similar terms such as satsuma ware and satsuma (orange) were also, along with several words from the dialect itself such as soy (Satsugū: そい~しょい ), later incorporated into the English language.

During the Edo period, the Sakoku Edict of 1635 led to the strict seclusion of Japan from the outside world. However, the Satsuma Domain, which spanned the provinces of Satsuma, Ōsumi, and the southwestern part of Hyūga, maintained trade relations with neighboring countries by using the Ryukyu Islands as a conduit, and by advocating that the islands distinctively formed an independent kingdom, even though in reality the Satsuma Domain had conquered the Ryūkyū Kingdom in 1609. The invasion of Ryukyu had assured Satsuma's place as one of the most powerful feudal domains in Tokugawa Japan, and would also set a precedent for Satsuma as a vital role in later overthrowing the Tokugawa shogunate and initiating the Meiji Restoration.

In the Fall of 1729, a ship from Satsuma bound for the province of Osaka drifted off course and ended up landing at Cape Lopatka, in Russia. Upon arrival, the crew were attacked by a group of cossacks led by Andreï Chtinnikov. Out of seventeen members, only two survived: a trader named Soza, and the pilot's son and apprentice, Gonza. The two were sent across the country to the capital of Saint Petersburg, where they were received in audience by Empress Anna Ivanovna, and later baptized in the Russian Orthodox Church. They went on afterwards to teach Japanese, and helped establish the first Japanese-language school in Russia. Gonza, who was also fluent in Russian, wrote and edited a number of books about the Japanese language, using the Cyrillic alphabet to transliterate words. These transliterations provide not only the oldest record of the Satsugū dialect, but have also been cited for their comprehensive evidence of the history, phonology and variability of the Japanese language.

When Japan started slowly opening up to the rest of the world in the mid 19th century, Satsuma was one of the first domains to embrace Western culture and methods. However, tension quickly grew between the increasing invasiveness of Westerners in southern Japan. When the Namamugi Incident of September 14, 1862 occurred, political and ideological differences between the United Kingdom and Satsuma Province sparked outrage and quickly boiled into the Anglo-Satsuma War. Satsuma would ultimately lose, leaving way to increasing dissatisfaction with the Tokugawan government. The Meiji government would then take its place after the Tokugawan government was overthrown in the Boshin War. However, corruption in the Meiji government, which it originally helped establish, would then give birth to the Satsuma Rebellion of 1877. Despite their numbers, the Satsuma Domain was rapidly overpowered, and its defeat eventually resulted in the end of its dominance in Japan's southern sphere.  The Satsugū dialect, which had a predominant role in samurai affairs and equally the police hierarchy system throughout Japan, steadily declined in influence following this defeat.

In July 1871, the Japanese domain system was abolished. The region of the Satsuma Domain mostly became part of the Kagoshima Prefecture, while a small portion of its northeastern region was incorporated into the Miyazaki Prefecture. The abolition of the domain system also brought forth standardized education. However, as Kagoshima was already an uncontested part of mainland Japan, assimilation through education was not a priority as it had been in Okinawa. Though contrary to Okinawa, the Satsuma clan sought to preserve the uniqueness of its own dialect. As such, the Satsugū dialect persisted.

When the United States later took control of Japan's South in World War II, Japanese officials tactically sought to exploit Kagoshima's more northern position, its advancement in shipping technology, and most notably the Satsugū dialect's mutual unintelligibility as a method of cryptographic communication between Japan and Germany. Dozens of international phone calls had been made using the Satsugū dialect, and despite being able to eavesdrop on the conversations being sent back and forth, the United States was unable to determine the language spoken. The use of the Satsugū dialect to further obfuscate communication during both the Second World War and possibly the period of the earlier Satsuma Domain has led to a popular belief that Satsugū was created as an artificial language and promoted for the purpose of being unintelligible in order to thwart enemy spies.

Current status 

Like all other Japanese dialects, the traditional dialects of Kagoshima are now being displaced by standard Japanese as a consequence of standardized education and centralized media, especially among the younger generation. As a result, many of the features that so characterize the dialects are now disappearing. In terms of phonology, for example, the palatalized variant of the vowel  is now being phased out, as is the retention of the labialized consonants . More prominently, many of the phonological processes, such as vowel coalescence and high vowel deletion, as well as most grammatical constructions and words that are unique to these dialects, are being completely uprooted by their standard forms.

Despite this, many popular words and expressions continue to persist today, even among younger speakers. Examples pulled from a research survey include  kibai-yanse "please do your best",  oyattosaa "thank you for your work",  anyo "older brother",  genne "shy", and  gattsui "exactly", among numerous others. The same research also revealed through interviews that, while people generally felt a positive vibe to hearing the traditional dialect spoken, those under the age of 40 expressed some difficulty understanding. One woman in her sixties was quoted saying: "There are now very few people who can use the true dialect".

Phonology

Vowels 

In terms of pronunciation, the Kagoshima dialects pattern with other far-western Honshu and Kyushu dialects, wherein the close back vowel  is slightly more rounded than in Tokyo Japanese. Additionally, the mid front unrounded vowel  differs from standard Japanese in that it retains the Late Middle Japanese variation between palatalized  and unpalatalized . This is similar to the palatalization observed with the vowel : . In Tanegashima, the mid back vowel  still exhibits rounding in some words such as  io  "fish" or  shio  "salt".

Vowel length remains contrastive in all regional dialects, but is noticeably less prominent and sometimes ambiguous in the mainland as a result of a process of vowel length reduction.

In comparison to standard Japanese, co-occurring vowel sequences tend to fuse into a single vowel, giving rise to a complex system of vowel coalescence in all regional dialects. Neither of these two coalesced vowels trigger palatalization, consider, for example:  "siblings" (not ).

Consonants 

The basic consonant inventory of the Satsugū dialect is the same as that of standard Japanese.

The plosive consonants  are laminal denti-alveolar and the fricatives  are laminal alveolar. Before  and palatalized , these sounds are alveolo-palatal and before  they are alveolar. In parts of northern Koshikijima exceptionally, the sounds  contrast with :  "song.DAT" vs  "song.TOP" vs  "hit.TOP".

The flap consonant  is generally an apical postalveolar flap with undefined laterality. In word medial and final position,  is frequently rendered as a glide (see sonorant gliding below). Examples of fortition include   →  "ease",   →  "next year",   →  "interesting; amusing", and   →  (pronounced ) "cooking".

Examples of this include -han for -san (negative 'su' ending), kagohima for Kagoshima, gowahi for gowashi (copula), sahikabui for sashikabui "long time no see", etc.

The labialized velar consonants  and  have limited use, contrasting  and  almost solely before the vowel . For example,   "conflagration" contrasts   "housework". Nowadays, however, these sounds are in regression and younger speakers merge them with their non-labialized counterparts as in standard Japanese. They may also surface in a few onomatopoeic words, such as   "woof woof".

Placeless consonants 
The archiphonemes  and  can also be represented by the uvular nasal  and the glottal stop . Both of these phonemes derive from a single process consisting of deleting the point of articulation of a given syllable, both correspond to a full mora, and both undergo a variety of assimilatory processes.

As with standard Japanese, the place of articulation of the moraic nasal , which corresponds to a reduced nasal syllable, is determined by the following consonant. Contrary to standard Japanese, however, the moraic nasal may also surface in word-initial position, as in the expression  ndamoshitan "wow!" or the word  nnma "horse".

Similarly, the moraic obstruent  corresponds to a reduced stop syllable. Contrary to the standard language, the moraic obstruent may occur word medially before any other sound except the moraic nasal. It may also occur in word-final position, which means that its phonetic realization cannot be immediately determined within the lexical unit. Like the moraic nasal, its place of articulation is mostly determined by the following consonant. Before other stops and fricatives, it assimilates, creating an effect of gemination. Before nasal syllables, the moraic obstruent may be realized, depending on the regional dialect, as a glottal stop , so that  "fox" is pronounced . Other dialects exhibit gemination in this position, so that the latter is pronounced  instead. At the end of utterances and in isolation, the moraic obstruent is predictably realized as a glottal stop , which may also suggest that a parallelism exists between the glottal stop in interjections and the moraic obstruent in standard Japanese itself.

For example, in Uchinoura,   became  "daughter",   became  "grilling on a skewer", and   became  "conflagration".

Phonological processes

Vowel coalescence 

Vowel coalescence or vowel fusion is a phonological process by which two consecutive vowels merge into a single one. For example, in most Japanese dialects including that of Tokyo, the sequence of  results in the monophthong :   →  "tall". Similarly, the Kagoshima dialects have also undergone a process of vowel coalescence. However, unlike dialects like that of Tokyo, the process is much more pervasive in Kagoshima, to the extent that early all vowel sequences exhibit some form of fusion.

Other mergers include  → ,  → ,  → ,  → , among numerous others that can be summarized in the following table, where the y-axis denotes the first vowel and the x-axis the second:

Despite the extent of this sound change, the Kagoshima dialects are not devoid of co-occurring vowels due to other, subsequent sound changes that have taken place in the dialects.

High-vowel deletion 

The remaining consonant is syllabified into coda position, where it is reduced to a moraic obstruent  if oral, or a moraic nasal  if nasal. In the case of the palatal approximant , it is reduced to its corresponding high vowel .

Word-medially, a syllable containing the high vowels  and  may also be reduced to its respective moraic equivalent if not already followed by a moraic obstruent or nasal.

A similar effect to high vowel deletion can be observed with sibilants. This has an effect of weakening the syllables within which they are contained, causing them to have no effect on pitch in the same way as both the moraic nasal and obstruent do not. Occasionally, such syllables may dropped entirely, leaving behind an assimilatory trace like the moraic obstruent.

Sonorant gliding 

When followed by another vowel, the  may turn into a palatal glide .

Note that, when it comes to the syllable , this sound change is mostly limited to the nominal rather than verbal paradigm, where the flap becomes a moraic obstruent instead (e.g.  → ).

Vowel length reduction 

Today, the dialects of mainland Satsuma and Ōsumi can be described as lacking compensatory vowel lengthening, so that two vowels which coalesce into one will be short rather than long.

Other changes 

Numerous other, less consistent changes have affected many of the regional dialects in Kagoshima. Some of these include:

 Historical vowel raising of the short vowel  to  following alveolar consonants in non-word-initial position:
  →  (→ ) "thing; matter"
  →  (→ ) "play"
  →  "over there"
 Historical vowel raising of the short vowel  to  following nasal consonants in word-final position, and subsequent reduction of the syllable to a moraic nasal in most Kagoshima dialects:
  →  →  "thing; person"
  →  →  "plural suffix"
  →  (→ ) "river; well"
  →  (→ ) "river; well"
  →  →  "soy sauce"
  →  "doctor"
  →  "cute"
 Intervocalic voicing of plosive consonants in southern Satsuma, notably in Makurazaki City:
  →  "man"
  →  "cherry blossom"

Phonotactics 
The syllable structure of the Kagoshima dialects is more complex than that of standard Japanese and can minimally be represented by the formula (C2)(G)V2(P), where C2 represents a consonant or cluster of two consonants, G represents a glide, V2 represents a vowel or sequence of vowels and P represents any placeless consonant.

The above formula accounts for nearly all permissible syllable structures, with only one exception which is that  and  can constitute full syllables on their own, found primarily only in word-initial position.

The following table illustrates some of the different types of syllables that are allowed in the Kagoshima dialects.

Prosody

Kagoshima accent 

One of the most oft-studied aspects of the Kagoshima dialect is its prosodic system. With the exception of a few areas such as Tanegashima, the system is described as a two-pattern pitch accent in which phrasal units may be either accented or unaccented. In accented units (also called "Type A" tone-bearing units), all syllables bear a low tonal pitch ("L") except for the penultimate syllable, which bears a high pitch ("H"). In unaccented units (also called "Type B" tone-bearing units), all syllables bear a low pitch until the final syllable, at which point the pitch rises to a high pitch.

  In accented words with only one syllable, the pitch is described as falling (sometimes written "F"). This is because the vowel is subject to lengthening, where the first mora in the syllable will bear a high tone while the second mora will bear a low tone. This means that  ki "spirit" would be pronounced like  and have a high-low (HL) pitch, as if it were a two-syllable word. This vowel length disappears when the word is followed by other morphemes such as particles.

Although the type of pitch accent is lexically determined, it is more specifically determined by the first element in a syntactic phrase and will apply to that entire phrase. This effectively means that the placement of the high tone in accented or unaccented units will shift rightwards to the penultimate or final syllable of the phrase when other morphemes, auxiliaries or grammatical particles such as  ga are appended at the end.

Because the accent pattern is always determined by the first element of the phrasal unit, prefixes will alter the accent type of the word to which they attach. For example,  ra "temple" and  ke are normally accented, but when the honorific prefix  o- is added, they shift to an unaccented pattern:  ote and  osa.

Note that the high tone falls on the syllable rather than the mora, so tone placement remains unaffected by moraic obstruents, moraic nasals, fricatives resulting from devoicing, long vowels and diphthongs.

Makurazaki accent 

The Makurazaki dialect, spoken in and around Makurazaki City, is described as a two-pattern pitch accent system very similar to that of the Kagoshima accent. In this dialect, accented units bear a high tone on all syllables except the penultimate syllable, which bears a low pitch. In unaccented units, all syllables have a high pitch except the final syllable, which bears a middle pitch ("M").

  The tone of unaccented words with one syllable has also been described as "falling", but it is not clear whether this manifests itself as vowel lengthening similar to accented words in the Kagoshima accent.

Like mainland Kagoshima, the accent type is determined by the first element in the phrasal unit and the pitch will shift accordingly as other morphemes are added. For example,  "flower" has a high-middle (HM) pitch in isolation, but when the particle  ga is appended, it becomes  "flower " with a high-high-middle pitch (HHM).

Koshikijima accent 

The prosodic system of Koshikijima, like that of mainland Kagoshima, is characterized as a two-pattern pitch accent. It differs, however, in the placement of the accent. In this system, the primary high tone falls on a mora and is always preceded by a low-pitched syllable. Any other syllables preceding the low one will automatically bear a high tone.

Similar to the Kagoshima Accent, the high tone is assigned to the very last mora in an unaccented unit. In an accented unit, the high tone falls on the penultimate mora and falls back down on the last mora. Tone placement will also shift accordingly when morphemes and the such are appended to the unit.

Otherwise, if the final low tone falls on a consonant-vowel syllable, any syllable that is added will shift the entire tone placement.

When multiple phrasal units are combined together, the second peak containing the primary high tone will become low in all units except the last one. Thus, for example, when the verbal phrase  e "was seen" is combined with the nominalized phrase  moga "wild animal", the accent pattern becomes:  monoga e "a wild animal was seen". Likewise, when it is combined with the colloquial form danga, the pattern becomes: damonga e.

Copula 

The standard Japanese plain copula  da is replaced by the Satsugū dialectal variation  ja, which has further developed into や ya in some parts of the Satsuma Peninsula, most notably the capital city, Kagoshima. Historically, these forms arose from a contraction of the classical construction  de aru. Accordingly, the copula borrows its conjugational pattern from the existential verb  aru, which is dialectally pronounced as  aʔ or  ai, as seen below:

 Politeness
Contrary to Western dialects, there exists no true equivalent to the standard polite copula  desu. In cases where standard Japanese would normally use desu, the Satsugū dialect would tend towards employing the plain form. For example,  kore desu yo becomes  koi ja ga, "this is it".

In very formal contexts, the honorific verb  gowasu or  gozasu, and their variants  gowansu and  gozansu, may be used instead. For the most part, their usage overlaps that of the standard form  gozaimasu. Compare, for example, the standard formulation  yō gozaimasu to the Satsugū variant  yoka to gowasu "it is alright"; or  hon de gozaimasu to  hon gowasu "it is a book". Note that while similar, the honorific copula gowasu or gozasu is not normally preceded by the connecting particle  de. Therefore, such forms as  *de gowasu may be considered calques on their standard counterpart.

Adjectives

Adjectival verbs 
A common feature among Western Kyūshū dialects is the difference in their adjective endings. Adjectival verbs, or true adjectives, end with the generic inflection -ka rather than -i in their attributive and predicative forms. Eastern Kyūshū dialects, however, follow the same pattern as Standard Japanese, using the inflectional ending -i. Positioned somewhat in the middle of this boundary, the Satsugū dialect makes use of both types of endings. For example, the adjectives "cold" and "exhausted" may surface as sanka and tesoka, or sami and tesoi (variants: sabi and tese) depending on the speaker and region. The -i ending will normally coalesce with the vowel of the preceding syllable (e.g.  +  → ), so that unmai "delicious" and gennai "shy" become unme and genne respectively.

The majority of Kagoshima's surrounding island dialects, however, tend to favor the generic inflection -ka, which may occasionally be voiced into -ga in southern parts of the Satsuma Peninsula, the Koshikijima Islands, Kuchinoerabujima and in northern Tanegashima. These peripheral dialects also tend to observe compensatory vowel lengthening when making use of the -i ending, so that the coalesced vowels will be long rather than short, thus resulting in unmee and gennee for "delicious" and "shy".

Inflection 
The -ka ending historically derives from a contraction of the adverbial or infinitive ending -ku followed by the conjugated form of the copular verb ari, from which the rest of the adjectival paradigm derives. As such, the -ka ending inflects mostly in the same way as the -i ending. It differs primarily in the negative form where the final -i in -kunai is also turned into a -ka, reflecting the basic inflectional form of the adjective. The -ka ending also differs in the hypothetical form, where it becomes -kare(ba) instead of -kere(ba) (compare sankareba to sankereba "if it's cold"). In relation to standard Japanese, both -ka and -i adjectives distinguish themselves in the participle form. Here, the participle form surfaces as っせえ -ssee for the standard くて -kute form.

  Unless already geminated, the syllable ku may be reduced to a moraic obstruent, resulting in a following geminate consonant. For example,  nukunaka may be pronounced as  nunnaka. This same reduction occurred in the participle form, where the syllable ku in -kusee (standard -kute) was turned into a geminate -ssee. Alternatively, the syllable ku can be reduced to just -u, conforming with the basic adverbial ending. For example,  nmakunaka becomes  nmonaka "it doesn't taste good".
  The hypothetical ending -reba can be colloquially pronounced as -ya as a result of sonorant gliding ( →  → ). Compare  yokareba to  yokaya "if it's good".

Adjectival nouns 
Adjectival nouns, also called nominal adjectives or na-adjectives, comprise a set of nouns that functionally act as adjectives by combining themselves with the copula. The copula is subsequently inflected for aspect and tense, becoming na in its common attributive form. For example, buchiho na te means "a rude person".

Adverbs 

With regards to adverbs, the same phonological process which reduced the Late Middle Japanese terminal and attributive endings (-shi and -ki, respectively) to -i, also reduced the  ending -ku to simply -u, yielding such forms as hayō (contraction of hayau) for hayaku "quickly". This change was once commonplace throughout Japan, however the adverbial form -ku was reintroduced through Standard Japanese as it was still preserved in some Eastern dialects. Even so, the -u ending persists in various honorifics (such as arigatō and omedetō) as a result of borrowing from the Kansai dialect, which was still regarded as a dialect of prestige well after it was no longer considered the standard language. Elsewhere, the -u ending remains a staple of Western Japanese and rural dialects. This includes the Satsugū dialect, where this ending still thrives today:

In addition to these characteristic adjectival adverbs, there are also many non-standard nominal and onomatopoeic adverbs unique to the dialects of Kagoshima. A few examples include:

Particles 

Particles ( joshi) used in the dialects of Kagoshima share many features common to other dialects spoken in Kyūshū, with some being unique to the Satsugū dialect, and others corresponding the Standard Japanese and Kyūshū variants. Like standard Japanese particles, they act as suffixes, prepositions or words immediately following the noun, verb, adjective or phrase that they modify, and are used to indicate the relationship between the various elements of a sentence.

Unlike central Japanese dialects, particles in the Kagoshima dialects are bound clitics, as they have the effect of resyllabifying the last word they attach to.

Resyllabification has also led to the reanalysis of some particles in a few dialects. For instance, the topic particle (w)a has been completely superseded by the form na in Izumi, which in most mainland dialects is merely a variant of (w)a after a moraic nasal.

For a full in-depth list of the particles found in this dialect, including examples, see the article Particles of the Kagoshima dialects.

Vocabulary

Pronouns 

Pronouns in the Satsugū dialect display considerable variation from their standard counterparts. The table below lists the most common pronouns as they occur in their basic forms. When followed by particles beginning with a vowel or a glide, affected pronouns will be resyllabified in the coda according to the phonological patterns of the local dialect. In most of mainland Kagoshima, for instance, when the pronouns oi "I" and ohan "you" are followed by the topic particle a, they become oya and ohanna respectively. Similarly, in Tanegashima, when the pronoun waga "oneself" is followed by the topic particle wa, it becomes wagoo.

Suffixes 

In mainland Kagoshima, the two suffixes  -don and  -taʔ are commonly appended to the pronouns above in order to indicate plurality:  oi "I" →  oidon "we",  ohan "you" →  ohantaʔ "you (pl)". The suffix -don historically derives from the ending  domo, as revealed when topicalized as  -doma. More rarely, it may also be topicalized as  -da, as in  oida "we." or  waida "you (pl).". Due to its pervasive use in the Satsuma region, the ending domo may have come to be associated with the speech of samurais, and thus carries a slight condescending or humble connotation in standard Japanese. The suffix -taʔ originates from  -tachi, and may be topicalized as  -tacha. Elsewhere in Kagoshima's peripheral islands, the forms differ only slightly. In the Satsunan islands, the ending  -domo is most common, and may be topicalized as domaa in Tanegashima. The ending -tachi appears to be favored in the Tokara Islands and may be clipped as -(t)chi in Tanegashima, resulting in such forms as wanchi or wagatchi for "you (pl)".

In the mainland, the suffix  -don also carries a second function: it can be used as an honorific as opposed to a plural-marking suffix. It is worth noting, however, that the honorific suffix stems from the historical form  dono, now used in standard Japanese almost uniquely in business correspondences. In Kagoshima, the usage of the honorific suffix -don corresponds very closely to that of the standard Japanese honorifics  sama and  san. For instance, -don can be used in a very pompous manner with the first-person pronoun, resulting in  oidon "I/my esteemed self", which is equivalent to standard Japanese  oresama. Other examples of honorific usage include  kakadon "mom" (standard:  okaasan),  oyaddon "dad" (standard:  otōsan) and  hidon "sun" (standard:  ohisama). The suffix is also used in terms of address in a similar way to -san in Japanese, so  Osako-don would be equivalent to  Ōsako-san in standard Japanese or "Mr./Ms. Ōsako" in English. Now more and more, however, this usage is being phased out in favor of its standard Japanese counterparts.

The honorific suffix  -sama is also used in a limited number of expressions, along with its more common mainland variant  -sa(a). For example,  anossaa or  anossama are honorific pronouns used to refer to a third person, while  tendosa is another honorific term used to refer to the sun, and  kansaa is an honorific referring to gods or deities. Under the influence of mainland Japanese and in certain regions like Nakanoshima, the variants  -san and  -han are used, especially with terms of kinship. Some examples from Nakanoshima include:  ottohan "dad",  okkahan "mom" and  ansan "older brother".

Demonstratives 

 * irregular formation; variants include ashiko, ahiko and akko

As with Standard Japanese, demonstratives also occur in the ko- (proximal), so- (mesial), and a- (distal) series, with the corresponding interrogative form as do-.

The pronoun series is created using the suffix -i, which is a reduced form of the standard suffix -re. Particles attached to this form may cause the underlying historical form -re to resurface. For example, when the dative particle -i (standard -ni) is attached, the forms become kore, sore, are and dore, since sonorant gliding (i.e.  → ) fails to trigger when the vowel stems from a historically long vowel or diphthong (i.e.  → ). So instead, vowel coalescence and vowel reduction are exhibited ( →  → ).

The determiner suffix surfaces as -n for the standard ending -no. Thus, "this book" would be expressed as  kon hon. The determiner series also serves to replace the standard Japanese person series -itsu by compounding onto it the noun waro (or warō in Tanegashima), roughly meaning "person", creating the forms kon waro, son waro, an waro and more rarely don waro. Tanegashima also appears to make use of the determiner series followed by the suffix 共 domo to indicate plurality, so kon domo would effectively mean "these people" or "these guys".

The kind and manner series, which are -nna(ni) and -u in standard Japanese, are grouped together under the -gen (before a verb) and -gena (before a noun) series, which may be elided to -en and -ena in casual speech. In parts of the Koshikijima Islands, the latter may be pronounced as -gan or -ran. In other parts, namely the Southern Satsuma Peninsula, these forms are replaced by compounding the determiner suffix -n with the noun yu followed by the directional suffix -n if used before a verb, thus creating the forms konyu(n), sonyu(n), anyu(n) and donyu(n). The preceding compound is equivalent to that of the standard form -noyou(ni), as in konoyou(ni), sonoyou(ni), etc.

The place suffix -ko remains the same as standard Japanese. However, the directional series -chira, preserved in the expression accha koccha "here and there" (standard achira kochira), is more commonly replaced by appending the directional particle -i (standard -ni and -e) to the place series, resulting in the form -ke (koke, soke, asuke, doke) due to vowel coalescence. In Tanegashima uniquely, this form is instead expressed by tagging on the directional particle -i to the pronominal series (-re), resulting in koree, soree, aree, and doree. The directional ending -tchi(i) is also in use in a number of areas, giving kotchi(i), sotchi(i), atchi(i), dotchi(i).

And lastly, the Satsugū dialect also makes use of an extra series that describes limits using the -shiko suffix, which is roughly the equivalent of the standard Japanese construction -re + -dake or -hodo. So sore dake "only that much" in standard Japanese would become soshiko in the dialect. To express approximation, as in "only about that much", the particle ばっかい bakkai may be added to form soshiko bakkai. The interrogative form doshiko is commonly used to ask about prices: doshiko na? "how much is it?" (standard ikura desu ka?).

Verbs 

The verbal morphology of the Kagoshima dialects is heavily marked by its divergent phonological processes. Vowels can, for instance, coalesce, devoice, or be deleted entirely depending on the preceding sound. For example, the standard form  kaku "write" becomes  kaʔ in the dialects of the mainland as a result of high vowel deletion. In addition to such changes, noticeable morphological differences exist between the standard language and the dialects. For example, the Kagoshima dialects pattern more closely with Western Japanese and Kyushu dialects, using the negative ending -n as opposed to -nai. So the form  kakan "not write" is used instead of the standard equivalent  kakanai. Other examples include the use of the form -ute instead of -tte in the imperfective (ta) and participle (te) forms of verbs ending with the vowel stem -u, or the auxiliary  oru ( oʔ) instead of  iru for the progressive form. More specific to regions of Kyushu, the dialects continue to use the form -(y)uru for verbs that would end in -eru in standard Japanese, as in  miyuru ( miyuʔ) "to be seen" instead of  mieru, and they also use the auxiliary verb gotaru (gotaʔ) where standard Japanese uses the ending -tai to express desire, as in  kwo-gotaʔ "want to eat" as opposed to the standard forms  kuitai or  tabetai.

Other noticeable differences specific to Kagoshima include its significant array of honorifics. Compare  tamoi-mosu to  tabemasu "(polite) eat". The endings  -su and  -nsu are also sometimes used to replace to stem of verbs ending in -ru in order to add an extra degree of politeness. As a result, multiple variants of the same verb may exist:  yaru,  yasu and  yansu are all formal auxiliaries used in imperative constructions, as in  tamoi-yanse "please eat". And, while the form  yai-mosu exists, the forms  yashi-mosu and  yanshi-mosu are not used, suggesting that  -su and  -nsu may be reduced forms of the auxiliary verbs  mosu and  monsu. Related differences include kui-yai or kui-yanse instead of the standard form kudasai for politely requesting that someones does something for the speaker.

Many other differences also exist, especially at the lexical level. Examples in mainland Kagoshima include asubu (asuʔ) instead of asobu "to play", keshinu (keshin) instead of shinu "to die", kibaru (kibaʔ) instead of ganbaru "to do one's best", saruku or sariku (saruʔ or sariʔ) instead of arukimawaru "to walk around", ayumu (ayun) instead of aruku "to walk", and so on.

See also 
Japanese dialects spoken north of Kagoshima:
 Hichiku dialect
 Hōnichi dialect

Japonic languages spoken directly south of the Kagoshima dialect boundaries:
 Amami Ōshima language
 Kikai language

Influential dialects:
 Kansai dialect (historically influential)
 Tokyo dialect (currently influential)

Notes

References 
 General

 Parts of this article were adapted from its correspondent Japanese article .
 
 
 
 
 
 
 
 
 
 

 Specific

Japanese dialects
Kagoshima Prefecture